Persatuan Sepakbola Serui, commonly known as Perseru Serui, or Perseru, was an Indonesian football club based in Yapen Islands Regency, Papua. Their nickname is The Orange Cendrawasih. The traditional team home kit is black and orange striped shirt, similar to Hull City or Shakhtar Donetsk. They last play in the Liga 1 in the Indonesian Football League. Their home stadium is Marora Stadium.

History
In 2010, the club gained promotion to the Premier Division after finishing as the fourth-ranked Liga Indonesia First Division.

In 2013, Perseru achieved his dream to compete at the highest football competition in Indonesia, Indonesia Super League after successfully stepped into the Premier Division Final 2013 season.

As of March 2019, Perseru was bought by a businessman in Lampung. Their home base will be moved to Lampung. There is a plan brewing that their name will be changed from Perseru to Badak Lampung F.C.

Honours
 Liga Indonesia Premier Division:
 Runners-up: 2013

References

External links
 Perseru Serui on Liga 1
 Perseru Serui on FIFA

 
Football clubs in Indonesia
Defunct football clubs in Indonesia
1970 establishments in Indonesia
Association football clubs established in 1970
Association football clubs disestablished in 2019
2019 disestablishments in Indonesia